The Mossel Bay Local Municipality council (within the South African Garden Route District Municipality) consists of twenty-nine members elected by mixed-member proportional representation. Fifteen councillors are elected by first-past-the-post voting in fifteen wards, while the remaining fourteen are chosen from party lists so that the total number of party representatives is proportional to the number of votes received.

Marie Ferreira of the Democratic Alliance (DA) became executive mayor after the March 2006 local government elections when the DA formed a coalition with Independent Civic Organisation of South Africa (ICOSA) since no single party had obtained an outright majority. The DA held 10 seats in the (then) 23-seat council followed by 8 for the African National Congress (ANC) and 3 for ICOSA. Following the September 2007, floor-crossing window the DA gained an outright majority when 3 councillors defected to the DA resulting in the DA holding 13 seats out of 23 while the ANC lost a seat to the DA and currently has 7. ICOSA lost its representation in the council when 2 councillors defected to the DA and its one ward councillor became an independent.

In the election of 1 November 2021 the DA won a majority of nineteen seats.

Results 
The following table shows the composition of the council after past elections.

December 2000 election

The following table shows the results of the 2000 election.

October 2002 floor crossing

In terms of the Eighth Amendment of the Constitution and the judgment of the Constitutional Court in United Democratic Movement v President of the Republic of South Africa and Others, in the period from 8–22 October 2002 councillors had the opportunity to cross the floor to a different political party without losing their seats.

In the Mossel Bay council, one councillor from the Democratic Alliance (DA) crossed the floor to the New National Party (NNP), which had formerly been part of the DA. The single councillor from the "Mosselbaai Gemeenskapsforum" crossed to the African National Congress.

September 2004 floor crossing
Another floor-crossing period occurred on 1–15 September 2004, in which the single NNP councillor crossed to the ANC.

By-elections from September 2004 to February 2006
The following by-elections were held to fill vacant ward seats in the period between the floor crossing periods in September 2004 and the election in March 2006.

March 2006 election

The following table shows the results of the 2006 election.

By-elections from March 2006 to August 2007
The following by-elections were held to fill vacant ward seats in the period between the election in March 2006 and the floor crossing period in September 2007.

September 2007 floor crossing
The final floor-crossing period occurred on 1–15 September 2007; floor-crossing was subsequently abolished in 2008 by the Fifteenth Amendment of the Constitution. In the Mossel Bay council two councillors from the Independent Civic Organisation (ICOSA) crossed to the Democratic Alliance (DA), while the third ICOSA councillor left the party to sit as an independent. One councillor crossed from the African National Congress to the DA.

By-elections from September 2007 to May 2011
The following by-elections were held to fill vacant ward seats in the period between the floor crossing period in September 2007 and the election in May 2011.

May 2011 election

The following table shows the results of the 2011 election.

By-elections from May 2011 to August 2016 
The following by-elections were held to fill vacant ward seats in the period between the elections in May 2011 and August 2016.

August 2016 election

The following table shows the results of the 2016 election.

November 2021 election

The following table shows the results of the 2021 election.

Notes

References

Mossel Bay
Elections in the Western Cape
Garden Route District Municipality